Pete Hart may refer to:

Parker T. Hart (1910–1997), U.S. diplomat
Peter D. Hart, American pollster
Peter E. Hart (born c. 1940s), computer scientist and pioneer in artificial intelligence
Peter Hart (historian) (1963–2010), Canadian historian, specialising in modern Irish history
Peter Hart, media analyst at Fairness and Accuracy in Reporting
Peter Hart (footballer) (born 1957), English footballer
Pete Hart (American football) (born 1933), American football player